Joseph Carter Abbott (July 15, 1825October 8, 1881) was a Union Army colonel during the American Civil War who was awarded the grade of brevet brigadier general of volunteers and a Republican United States Senator from the state of North Carolina between 1868 and 1871. During his career in private life he was a lawyer, newspaper editor and businessman. He also served as collector of the port of Wilmington, inspector of posts along the eastern line of the southern coast during the Rutherford B. Hayes Administration, and special agent of the United States Treasury Department.

Early life
Abbott was born in Concord, New Hampshire to farmer Aaron Carter Abbott and Nancy Badger, and graduated from Phillips Academy in Andover, Massachusetts, in 1846, having studied there and under private auspices. He studied law at Concord, and was admitted to the bar in 1852. From 1852 to 1857, Abbott was the owner and editor of the Daily American newspaper, in Manchester, New Hampshire. His success with it led to his being given the position of editor of the Boston Atlas and Bee, which he held from 1859 through 1861.

He served as adjutant general for New Hampshire from 1855–61, reorganizing the state militia during that time. He was also a member of the commission to adjust the boundary between New Hampshire and Canada. He early joined the Know Nothing Party, and during all these years was a frequent contributor to the magazines, being particularly interested in historical matters.

Civil War
In December 1861, Abbott became the lieutenant colonel of the 7th New Hampshire Volunteer Infantry Regiment and participated in the battles of Port Royal Sound, St. John's Bluff, Fort Pulaski and Fort Wagner.  In November 1863, he became colonel of the regiment and led it at the Battle of Olustee and during the subsequent Bermuda Hundred Campaign in Virginia.

During the siege of Petersburg, he commanded the 2nd Brigade, 1st Division, X Corps at Chaffin's Farm and the subsequent actions along the Darbytown and New Market Roads.  The Army of the James was then reorganized and his command became the 2nd Brigade, 2nd Division, XXIV Corps which was attached to the Fort Fisher Expeditionary Corps under Brig. Gen. Alfred H. Terry and participated in the second battle of Fort Fisher and the capture of Wilmington. Although Abbott was not appointed as a full, substantive rank general, on January 25, 1865, President Abraham Lincoln nominated Abbott for appointment to the grade of brevet brigadier general of volunteers, to rank from January 15, 1865 for gallant services in the capture of Fort Fisher and the U.S. Senate confirmed the award on February 14, 1865. During the final stages of the war, he was stationed in Wilmington, North Carolina.

Postbellum
Following the war, Abbott remained in North Carolina. He was active in state politics, serving as a delegate to the State constitutional convention in 1868. During this time, his political strength came primarily through the black population.  He believed in their capacity and assisted in organization and politically counseling them in ways which brought him blunt warnings from the white population.  He was elected to the United States Senate that same year, representing North Carolina in that body for the first time since July 1861, when the state's two senators were expelled following the North Carolina's secession from the Union.  He served as a Senator from July 14, 1868 to March 4, 1871.

He also served as a member of the Republican National Committee from North Carolina from 1870 through 1872.  During this period, he was also found to be in the pay of a "ring" whose major interests seemed substantially similar to Abbott's own political positions. During his tenure in the Senate, he spoke in orthodox terms on matters of suffrage, and was helpful in handling the details of army administration.  He devoted a good deal of time to improve the harbor of Wilmington, and hoped that the railroads of the Carolinas would be consolidated and made part of a southern transcontinental system.  However, for all his efforts, his single greatest achievement was the imposition of a duty on peanuts. He was not nominated for a second term to the Senate.

Upon leaving the Senate, he conducted a lumber manufacturing business and served as editor of the Wilmington Post. He also received federal offices from both Presidents Rutherford Hayes and Ulysses S. Grant, including serving as collector of the port of Wilmington, inspector of posts along the eastern line of the southern coast during the Rutherford B. Hayes Administration, and special agent of the United States Treasury Department. From August, 1869, he served as editor of the Wilmington Post, a Republican organ of good quality for the era.  However, he never again achieved any real status as a party leader. He established the town of Abbottsburg, North Carolina.

He was originally buried in the National Cemetery in Wilmington, North Carolina. He was reinterred in 1887 at Valley Cemetery in Manchester, New Hampshire.  Despite three marriages, he died childless.  His political legacy is not much better, with the Dictionary of American Biography writing that "The historians of the state even now mention him only to condemn him."

See also

List of American Civil War Generals (Union)

Notes

References
Biographical Directory of the United States Congress, 1774-1989: Bicentennial Edition. United States: Government Printing Office, 1989. .
Eicher, John H., and Eicher, David J. Civil War High Commands. Stanford: Stanford University Press, 2001. .
Hunt, Roger D. and Brown, Jack R. Brevet Brigadier Generals in Blue. Gaithersburg, MD: Olde Soldier Books, Inc., 1990. .
Johnson, Allen. Dictionary of American Biography. New York: Charles Scribner's Sons, 1964.

External links
 Retrieved on 2008-02-11

1825 births
1881 deaths
Politicians from Concord, New Hampshire
American people of English descent
Republican Party United States senators from North Carolina
North Carolina Republicans
19th-century American politicians
19th-century American newspaper editors
Politicians from Wilmington, North Carolina
Politicians from Manchester, New Hampshire
Lawyers from Boston
American male journalists
19th-century American male writers
People of New Hampshire in the American Civil War
Union Army colonels
Burials at Valley Cemetery
19th-century American lawyers